A ministry of economy, ministry of commerce, ministry of economic affairs or department of commerce is a part of the government in most countries that is responsible for matters related to the economy or economic policy.

List

Examples of such ministries include:

Afghanistan: Ministry of Economy (Afghanistan)
Albania: Ministry of Economic Development, Trade and Entrepreneurship (Albania)
Argentina: Minister of Economy of Argentina
Austria: Ministry of Economy (Austria)
Belarus: Ministry of Economy
Benin: Ministry of Economy and Finance (Benin)
Bulgaria: Ministry of Economy, Energy and Tourism (Bulgaria)
Bhutan: Ministry of Economic Affairs (Bhutan)
Brazil: Ministry of Economy (Brazil)
Cambodia: Ministry of Economy and Finance (Cambodia)
Chile: Ministry of Economy, Development and Tourism
Croatia: Ministry of Economy (Croatia)
Denmark: Ministry of Economic and Business Affairs (Denmark)
Dominican Republic: Ministry of Economy (Dominican Republic)
Estonia: Ministry of Economic Affairs and Communications
Finland: Ministry of Economic Affairs and Employment (Finland)
France: Ministry of the Economy and Finance (France)
Georgia: Ministry of Economy and Sustainable Development (Georgia)
Germany: Federal Ministry for Economic Affairs and Energy
Iran: Ministry of Economic Affairs and Finance (Iran)
Israel: Ministry of Economy
Italy: Ministry of Economy and Finance (Italy)
Japan: Ministry of Economy, Trade and Industry
Kazakhstan: Ministry of National Economy (Kazakhstan)
Latvia: Ministry of Economics (Latvia)
Lithuania: Ministry of Economy (Lithuania)
Malaysia: Ministry of Economic Affairs
Malta: Ministry for the Economy, Investment and Small Business
Moldova: Ministry of Economy and Infrastructure (Moldova)
Netherlands: Ministry of Economic Affairs (Netherlands)
Peru: Ministry of Economy and Finance (Peru)
Poland: Ministry of Economy (Poland)
Portugal: Ministry of Economy (Portugal)
Romania: Ministry of Economy, Commerce and Business Environment (Romania)
Saudi Arabia: Ministry of Economy and Planning
South Korea: Ministry of Economy and Finance (South Korea)
Spain: Ministry of Economy and Finance (Spain)
Syria: Ministry of Economy and Trade (Syria)
Tanzania: Ministry of Finance and Economic Affairs (Tanzania)
Taiwan: Ministry of Economic Affairs (Taiwan)
Turkey: Ministry of Economy (Turkey)
Ukraine: Ministry of Economic Development and Trade (Ukraine)
United Kingdom: HM Treasury
USA: United States Department of Commerce
Uzbekistan: Ministry of Economy (Uzbekistan)
Zimbabwe: Ministry of Economic Planning and Investment Promotion (Zimbabwe)

See also
 Ministry of Economy and Finance (disambiguation)
 Ministry of Economic Development (disambiguation)
 Finance minister
 Commerce minister